The 77th Infantry Regiment (77e régiment d’infanterie de ligne) is a regiment of the French Army. It traces its origins to both the 2nd Light Royal-Italian Regiment (1671) and the Kônigsmarck Regiment (1680). It was dissolved in 1940.

People who served with the 77th Infantry Regiment
 Charles Mangin

Regiments of the First French Empire
20th-century regiments of France
Military units and formations disestablished in 1940
Infantry regiments of France